Graham Norman Tope, Baron Tope,  (born 30 November 1943) is a Liberal Democrat politician in the United Kingdom. He was also a councillor in the London Borough of Sutton until 2014.

In 1972, Tope captured the seat of Sutton and Cheam at a parliamentary by-election from the Conservatives for the Liberal Party. The Conservatives retook the seat at the February 1974 general election.

In November 1973, Tope was made spokesperson for the Liberal Party on health and social security and Northern Ireland.

Having been appointed a Commander of the Order of the British Empire (CBE) in the 1991 Birthday Honours, Tope was created a life peer as Baron Tope, of Sutton in the London Borough of Sutton on 4 October 1994.  He is a member of the Committee of the Regions of the European Union and is the only person in the country to have served as a member of a European Institution, a member of the UK Parliament, a member of a regional government structure and as a borough councillor all at the same time.

At the London Assembly, he was leader of the Liberal Democrat Group until 2006, member of the Audit Panel, and member of the Transport Committee. He was also a member of the Metropolitan Police Authority, which oversees the Metropolitan Police.

References

External links
Graham Tope: profile at the site of Liberal Democrats 
Graham Tope: biography from the London Assembly

1943 births
Living people
Liberal Party (UK) MPs for English constituencies
Councillors in the London Borough of Sutton
Liberal Democrats (UK) life peers
Liberal Democrat Members of the London Assembly
People educated at Whitgift School
UK MPs 1970–1974
Commanders of the Order of the British Empire
Life peers created by Elizabeth II